Rvo (also, Rivo) is a village and municipality in the Lankaran Rayon of Azerbaijan.  It has a population of 1,462.  The municipality consists of the villages of Rvo, Siyablı, and Mollakənd.

References 

Populated places in Lankaran District